Chahak (also Romanized as Chāhak) is a village in Deh Kahan Rural District, Aseminun District, Manujan County, Kerman Province, Iran. At the 2006 census, its population was 82, in 18 families.

References 

Populated places in Manujan County